Alysha Boekhoudt (born September 19, 1993) is an Aruban model and beauty pageant titleholder who was crowned Miss Aruba 2015 and represented Aruba at the Miss Universe 2015 pageant.

Personal life

Miss Aruba 2015
On August 23, 2015, Alysha Boekhoudt was crowned Miss Aruba 2015 and was also awarded as Miss Photogenic in the final. The runners-up were  Nicole van Tellingen (Miss World Aruba 2015) and Thalia Croes.

As Miss Aruba 2015, Alysha Boekhoudt competed at the Miss Universe 2015 pageant, however she did not place.

References

External links

Aruban beauty pageant winners
Aruban female models
Living people
Miss Universe 2015 contestants
1993 births